The Mexico women's national under-18 and under-19 basketball team, is controlled by the Asociación Deportiva Mexicana de Básquetbol and represents Mexico in international under-18 and under-19 (under age 18 and under age 19) women's basketball competitions.

See also
 Mexico women's national basketball team
 Mexico women's national under-17 basketball team
 Mexico men's national under-19 basketball team

References

External links
 Mexico Basketball Federation

Women's national under-19 basketball teams
Basketball